Raymond Chow Man-wai,  (8 October 1927 – 2 November 2018) was a Hong Kong film producer, and presenter. He was responsible for successfully launching martial arts and the Hong Kong cinema onto the international stage. As the founder of Golden Harvest, he produced some of the biggest stars of the martial arts film genre, including Bruce Lee, Jackie Chan, Sammo Hung, Jimmy Wang Yu, Cynthia Rothrock and Tsui Hark.

Early life
Of Hakka Han ethnicity, Chow studied martial arts under the Hung Ga master Lam Sai-wing. He attended Saint John's University, Shanghai, and graduated with a B.A in journalism in 1949. He started working on the Hongkong Standard. In 1951, he joined the Voice of America office in Hong Kong.

Career 
Chow's film career began in 1958. He started as a publicity manager at Shaw Brothers but was soon made the head of publicity and was the head of production for 10 years until 1970. He leased Cathay's studio and contracted its exhibition chain of 104 cinema theatres in Southeast Asia. At the time Cathay was a predominant force in the Malaysian film industry.

When Cathay wanted to end the company's association in Hong Kong, Chow left Shaw Brothers to establish Golden Harvest along with film producer Leonard Ho in 1970. He capitalised on the shortcomings of Shaw Brothers, who had a system that limited creativity, and was able to lure Bruce Lee into Golden Harvest, making it a serious competitor to Shaw Brothers following the release of The Big Boss (1971). Chow's films with Lee became the first Hong Kong films to reach a large worldwide audience. Under Chow's leadership, Golden Harvest would become the cornerstone for Hong Kong cinema leading Hong Kong box office sales for two decades from the 1970s to 1980s as well as expanding into international distribution. In 1981, the National Association of Theatre Owners named Chow their International Showman of the Year for his contributions to the US film industry following the success of The Cannonball Run.

Whilst Chow is credited with producing many films, in the audio commentary for the UK release of Zu Warriors from the Magic Mountain, Tsui Hark was asked the elementary question of Chow's role as a film producer, explained that this credit is mostly meaningless. Tsui stated that any producer's role at the studio was often nothing more than to greenlight and ensure funding of the project, and that producers such as Chow would rarely, if ever, set foot on the set during the making of the film. Raymond Chow officially announced his retirement in Hong Kong on 5 November 2007.

Personal life
Chow married Felicia Yuen Hei-wah (袁曦華) and they had a daughter Roberta Chow (鄒重珩) in 1963. Chow also had an affair with a media writer Ng Suk-fong (伍淑芳), with pen name of Lan Yan (藍茵). Ng gave birth to his illegitimate son Felix Chow (鄒重珏) in 1960, followed by a second son Terence Chow (鄒重瑾), in 1963. However Chow was unable to give Ng and their illegitimate children any legitimacy due to his marriage to Yuen, chose to separate with them but continued with financial support. Ng died of illness in 1967 and her two sons were raised by her sister.

Chow competed in international contract bridge tournaments and was a regular at the Royal Hong Kong Golf Club.

Death 
On 2 November 2018, Chow died in Hong Kong. He was survived by a daughter with his late wife and two sons with his late mistress.

References

External links
 Raymond Chow at HKcinemagic
 CineAsia 2007 Awards

1927 births
Hong Kong chief executives
Hong Kong film producers
Hong Kong film presenters
Hong Kong people of Hakka descent
2018 deaths
People from Dabu
Officers of the Order of the British Empire
Recipients of the Gold Bauhinia Star
St. John's University, Shanghai alumni